The 2009–10 Coupe de France was the 93rd season of the most prestigious French cup competition, organized by the French Football Federation, and was open to all clubs in French football, as well as clubs from the overseas departments and territories (Guadeloupe, French Guiana, Martinique, Mayotte, New Caledonia, French Polynesia, and Réunion). The final was contested on 1 May 2010 at the Stade de France. The defending champions were Guingamp, who had defeated Rennes 2–1 in the 2008–09 final.

The winner of the competition qualified for the 2010–11 UEFA Europa League and was inserted into the Playoff round. Ligue 1 club Paris Saint-Germain won the competition by defeating fellow first division club AS Monaco by a score of 1–0 in the final. The victory gave Paris Saint-Germain their eight Coupe de France title and their third this millennium.

Calendar
On 23 June 2009, the French Football Federation announced the calendar for the Coupe de France.

Regional qualifying rounds

All the teams that entered the competition, but were not members of Ligue 1 or Ligue 2, had to compete in the regional qualifying rounds. The regional qualifying rounds determined the number of regional clubs that earned spots in the 7th round and this normally lasted six rounds.

Seventh round
The draw for the seventh round of Coupe de France was conducted on 5 November 2009 at the Maison du Sport Français, the headquarters of the French Football Federation, in Paris by French journalist and television host Michel Drucker and Jean Djorkaeff, the president of the Coupe de France Commission. The overseas regional draw was conducted in Paris the same day, by World fencing champions Adriana Lamalle and Jean-Michel Lucenay. The matches were played on 21 and 22 November 2009.

Overseas region

Eighth round
The draw for the eighth round of the Coupe de France was conducted on 25 November 2009 at the headquarters of the French Football Federation, in Paris, by FCF Juvisy and women's national team member Sandrine Soubeyrand, taekwondo world champion Gwladys Épangue, former national team member Steve Marlet, and Jean Djorkaeff, the president of the Coupe de France Commission. The matches were played on 12 and 13 December 2009.

Round of 64
The draw for the round of 64 of the Coupe de France was conducted on 14 December 2009 at the Champ Libres in Rennes, by former French internationals Stéphane Guivarc'h and Daniel Rodighiero, Stade Briochin and women's national team member Eugénie Le Sommer, and the current captain of the France women's national rugby union team Sandrine Agricole. The matches were played on 9 and 10 January 2010. The matches that were postponed were contested at a later date.

Round of 32
The draw for the round of 32 of the Coupe de France was conducted on 10 January 2010 at the Eurosport headquarters in Paris, by Miss France 2010 Malika Ménard and France national team manager Raymond Domenech. The matches will be played from 22 to 24 January 2010. The matches that had to be rescheduled due to the previous round's postponed matches being contested were played mid-week on 26 and 27 January. The cancelled matches, as a result of the round of 64 matches being rescheduled, were played on 3 February and the mid-week over on 10 February.

Round of 16
The draw for the round of 16 of the Coupe de France was conducted on 24 January 2010 at the Eurosport headquarters in Paris, by former French international Jean-Pierre Papin and French film director Fabien Onteniente. The matches were played on 9 and 10 February. The canceled match, Lens – Brest, as a result of the round of 32 matches being rescheduled, was played on 17 February.

Quarter-finals
The draw for the quarterfinals of the Coupe de France was conducted on 14 February 2010 during a Six Nations rugby match between France and Ireland at the Stade de France. The draw was conducted by 2009 World Judo champion Morgane Ribout and Morgan Parra, a player from the national rugby team. The matches will be contested on 23 and 24 March. The Quevilly – Boulogne match was moved to the Stade Robert Diochon in nearby Rouen to accommodate the anticipated high attendance for the match. Quevilly's parent ground, Stade Lozai, seats only 2,500 spectators.

Semi-finals
The draw for the semi-finals of the Coupe de France was conducted on 28 March 2010 during a broadcast of France 2 show Stade 2. The draw was conducted by former Gabon national team manager and former French international Alain Giresse. The matches were contested on 13 and 14 April. The first match was televised on Eurosport and the second match was shown on France 2. The Quevilly – Paris Saint-Germain match was moved to the Stade Michel d'Ornano in Caen, which is located in Lower Normandy, not far from Rouen, which situates in Upper Normandy. The move, similar to the previous round, was made to accommodate the anticipated high attendance for the match and also because the French Football Federation felt the Stade Robert Diochon did not meet the standards needed to host a Coupe de France semi-final match.

Final

Topscorer
Ireneusz Jeleń (4 goals)
Mevlüt Erdinç (4 goals)

Media coverage
For the second consecutive season in France, France Télévisions were the free to air broadcasters while Eurosport were the subscription broadcasters.

These matches were broadcast live on French television:

References

External links

 Official site 

 
2009–10 in French football
2009–10 domestic association football cups
2009-10